And Now the Rain Sounds Like Life Is Falling Down Through It is the third studio album by guitarist and composer Roy Montgomery, released on 13 April 1998 by Drunken Fish Records.

Track listing

Personnel 
Adapted from the And Now the Rain Sounds Like Life Is Falling Down Through It liner notes.
 Roy Montgomery – guitar, EBow, mixing
 Robert Meissner – piano
 Jessica Meyer – illustrations

Release history

References

External links 
 And Now the Rain Sounds Like Life Is Falling Down Through It at Discogs (list of releases)

1998 albums
Roy Montgomery albums
Drunken Fish Records albums